The Pigtail of Ah Lee Ben Loo with Seventeen other Laughable Tales and 200 Comical Silhouettes is a children's book written and illustrated by John Bennett. This is a collection of fairy tales and short stories, some in verse, which take place variously in China, Persia, Europe, and America. Some of the pieces were first published in St. Nicholas Magazine before being collected here. The book was first published in 1928 and was a Newbery Honor recipient in 1929.

References

1928 short story collections
American children's books
Collections of fairy tales
Children's poetry books
Newbery Honor-winning works
Children's short story collections
American short story collections
1928 children's books
1928 poetry books